Sindora is a genus of legume in the family Fabaceae.

Species
Sindora comprises the following species:
 Sindora affinis
 Sindora beccariana
 Sindora bruggemanii
 Sindora coriacea
 Sindora echinocalyx
 Sindora galedupa
 Sindora glabra
 Sindora inermis
 Sindora irpicina 
 Sindora javanica
 Sindora klaineana
 Sindora laotica
 Sindora leiocarpa  
 Sindora siamensis 
 Sindora supa
 Sindora tonkinensis
 Sindora velutina
 Sindora wallichii

References

External links

 
Fabaceae genera
Flora of Indo-China
Taxonomy articles created by Polbot